The 3rd Magritte Awards ceremony, presented by the Académie André Delvaux, honored the best films of 2012 in Belgium and took place on February 2, 2013, at the Square in the historic site of Mont des Arts, Brussels beginning at 8:00 p.m. CET. During the ceremony, the Académie André Delvaux presented Magritte Awards in 20 categories. The ceremony was televised in Belgium by BeTV. Actress Yolande Moreau presided the ceremony, while actor Fabrizio Rongione hosted the show for the first time.

The nominees for the 3rd Magritte Awards were announced on January 10, 2013. Films receiving the most nominations were Dead Man Talking with eight, followed by Our Children, Mobile Home and One Night with seven. The winners were announced during the awards ceremony on February 2, 2013. Our Children won four awards, including Best Film and Best Director for Joachim Lafosse. Other multiple winners were The Minister with three awards, and Mobile Home with two.

Winners and nominees

Best Film
 Our Children (À perdre la raison)
 Dead Man Talking
 Mobile Home
 One Night (38 témoins)

Best Director
 Joachim Lafosse – Our Children (À perdre la raison)
 Lucas Belvaux – One Night (38 témoins)
 François Pirot – Mobile Home
 Patrick Ridremont – Dead Man Talking

Best Flemish Film in Coproduction
 Time of My Life (Tot altijd)
 Little Black Spiders
 Madonna's Pig (Het varken van Madonna)

Best Foreign Film in Coproduction
 The Minister (L'Exercice de l'État)
 The Angels' Share
 Rust and Bone (De rouille et d'os)
 When Pigs Have Wings (Le Cochon de Gaza)

Best Screenplay
 One Night (38 témoins) – Lucas Belvaux Dead Man Talking – Patrick Ridremont and Jean-Sébastien Lopez
 Mobile Home – François Pirot, Maarten Loix, and Jean-Benoît Ugeux
 Our Children (À perdre la raison) – Joachim Lafosse and Matthieu Reynaert

Best Actor
 Olivier Gourmet – The Minister (L'Exercice de l'État)
 Benoît Poelvoorde – Le grand soir
 Jérémie Renier – My Way (Cloclo)
 Matthias Schoenaerts – Rust and Bone (De rouille et d'os)

Best Actress
 Émilie Dequenne – Our Children (À perdre la raison)
 Christelle Cornil – Miles from Anywhere (Au cul du loup)
 Déborah François – A Checkout Girl's Big Adventures (Les Tribulations d'une caissière)
 Marie Gillain – All Our Desires (Toutes nos envies)

Best Supporting Actor
 Bouli Lanners – Rust and Bone (De rouille et d'os)
 Jean-Luc Couchard – Dead Man Talking
 Dieudonné Kabongo – The Invader (L'envahisseur)
 Denis M'Punga – Dead Man Talking

Best Supporting Actress
 Yolande Moreau – Camille Rewinds (Camille redouble)
 Stéphane Bissot – Our Children (À perdre la raison)
 Natacha Régnier – One Night (38 témoins)
 Catherine Salée – Mobile Home

Most Promising Actor
 David Murgia – Headfirst (La Tête la première)
 Cédric Constantin – Torpedo
 Gael Maleux – Mobile Home
 Martin Swabey – Little Glory

Most Promising Actress
 Anne-Pascale Clairembourg – Mobile Home
 Pauline Burlet – Dead Man Talking
 Mona Jabé – Miss Mouche
 Aurora Marion – Almayer's Folly (La Folie Almayer)

Best Cinematography
 Last Winter (L'Hiver dernier) – Hichame Alaouie Almayer's Folly (La Folie Almayer) – Remon Fromont
 Dead Man Talking – Danny Elsen

Best Sound
 The Minister (L'Exercice de l'État) – Julie Brenta and Olivier Hespel One Night (38 témoins) – Henri Morelle, Luc Thomas, and Aline Gavroy
 Our Children (À perdre la raison) – Ingrid Simon and Thomas Gauder

Best Production Design
 Dead Man Talking – Alina Santos The Invader (L'envahisseur) – Françoise Joset
 Almayer's Folly (La Folie Almayer) – Patrick Dechesne and Alain-Pascal Housiaux

Best Costume Design
 Le grand soir – Florence Laforge The Minister (L'Exercice de l'État) – Pascaline Chavanne
 Almayer's Folly (La Folie Almayer) – Catherine Marchand

Best Original Score
 Mobile Home – Coyote, Renaud Mayeur, François Petit, and Michaël de Zanet Last Winter (L'Hiver dernier) – DAAU
 One Night (38 témoins) – Arne Van Dongen

Best Editing
 Our Children (À perdre la raison) – Sophie Vercruysse Approved for Adoption (Couleur de peau: miel) – Ewin Ryckaert
 One Night (38 témoins) – Ludo Troch
 When Pigs Have Wings (Le Cochon de Gaza) – Damien Keyeux

Best Short Film
 The Lobster's Cry (Le cri du homard)
 Domestic Tale (Fable domestique)
 A New Old Story
 U.H.T.

Best Documentary
 Tea or Electricity (Le thé ou l'électricité)
 The Chebeya Case (L'affaire Chebeya, un crime d'Etat?)
 Cinéma Inch'Allah!
 Greetings from the Colony (Bons baisers de la colonie)

Honorary Magritte Award
Costa-Gavras

Films with multiple nominations and awards

The following eleven films received multiple nominations.

 Eight: Dead Man Talking
 Seven: Mobile Home, One Night, and Our Children
 Four: Almayer's Folly and The Minister
 Three: Rust and Bone
 Two: The Invader, Last Winter, Le grand soir, and When Pigs Have Wings

The following three films received multiple awards.

 Four: Our Children
 Three: The Minister
 Two: Mobile Home

See also

 38th César Awards
 18th Lumières Awards
 2012 in film

References

External links
 
 
 3rd Magritte Awards at AlloCiné

2013
2012 film awards
2013 in Belgium